Harlan Grant Cohen is the Gabriel M. Wilner/UGA Foundation Professor in International Law at University of Georgia, where he teaches courses on international law, U.S. foreign relations law, global governance, and international trade. He has also taught the international law colloquium, international human rights law, international business transactions, and international criminal law. 

Cohen's scholarship focuses on international legal theory, global governance, international trade, and U.S. foreign relations law. Strands of his work focus on sources, authority, and fragmentation in international law, international law's communities of practice, the function of international courts and tribunals, the role of history in both international and foreign relations law, and the U.S. Supreme Court's approaches to foreign relations law question s. He is a member of the Board of Editors of the American Journal of International Law and the American Law Institute. 

Cohen graduated from Yale University with a BA in History and International Studies, and returned for an MA in History. He attended law school at NYU and is admitted to practice in the state of New York.

References

External links
 http://law.uga.edu/profile/harlan-g-cohen
 https://papers.ssrn.com/sol3/cf_dev/AbsByAuth.cfm?per_id=550582

Year of birth missing (living people)
Living people
University of Georgia faculty
American lawyers
Yale College alumni
New York University alumni
American legal scholars